UMODL1 antisense RNA 1 is a long non-coding RNA (lncRNA) that in humans is produced by transcription of the UMODL1-AS1 gene.

References

Further reading